Yauhen Sobal (born 7 April 1981) is a Belarusian cyclist, who currently rides for UCI Continental team . He competed in the points race at the 2004 Summer Olympics.

Major results

2001
 1st  Road race, National Road Championships
2003
 National Road Championships
1st  Road race
1st  Time trial
2004
 Tour of Turkey
1st Stages 1 & 2
2005
 2nd Les Boucles du Sud Ardèche
 10th GP Capodarco
2006
 1st Stage 1 Giro della Valle d'Aosta
2007
 6th Giro dell'Appennino
 6th Coppa Agostoni
 9th GP Nobili Rubinetterie
 9th Overall Giro del Trentino
2008
 1st Stage 1 Settimana Ciclistica Lombarda
 5th Overall Tour de Langkawi
2009
 1st Stage 2 Tour de Serbie
 3rd GP Kranj
2010
 2nd Road race, National Road Championships
 7th Overall Tour de Serbie
 10th Overall Five Rings of Moscow
2016
 1st Overall Course de la Solidarité Olympique
1st Stage 5
 6th Overall Tour of Ukraine
 10th Tour de Ribas
2017
 3rd Time trial, National Road Championships
 3rd Minsk Cup
 8th Overall Tour of Quanzhou Bay
 10th Horizon Park Race for Peace
2018
 2nd Overall Tour de Serbie
 7th Grand Prix Side
 7th Grand Prix Alanya
2019
 National Road Championships
1st  Road race
1st  Time trial
 1st Overall Five Rings of Moscow
 1st Horizon Park Race for Peace
 3rd Overall Tour of China I
2020
 National Road Championships
1st  Road race
4th Time trial
2021
 10th Grand Prix Alanya

References

External links

1981 births
Living people
Belarusian male cyclists
Olympic cyclists of Belarus
Cyclists at the 2004 Summer Olympics
European Games competitors for Belarus
Cyclists at the 2019 European Games